Fairbridge was a UK charity that supported young people aged 13–25 from 1987. Each year it supported around 3,700 disengaged young people who were either not in education, employment or training – or at risk of becoming so – at one of its fifteen centres on the country.

In January 2011 it was announced that Fairbridge would become part of The Prince's Trust.

History
Fairbridge is the result of the merging of two organisations, the Drake Fellowship and the Fairbridge Society.

The Fairbridge Society was established in 1909 by Kingsley Fairbridge. Moved by the levels of deprivation he saw in inner city areas of England, he established a charity to offer opportunities and education abroad to young people from broken homes. Currently (2017) The Independent Inquiry into Child Sexual Abuse (IICSA), in full public hearings, is investigating the sexual abuse of children who were removed from British institutions and families between 1947 and the 70s, and taken to Australia and Canada by various charities and churches, including the Fairbridge Society.

Operation Drake was launched in 1978 at the suggestion of The Prince of Wales. It was a two-year, round-the-world venture in which 400 young people from 27 nations worked with scientists and servicemen on projects in 16 countries. John Mogg (British Army officer)(also known as Sir Herbert John Mogg) was a chairman of the Operation Drake Fellowship.

In 1980, George Thurstan, one of the organisers of Operation Drake, formed the Drake Fellowship to help under-privileged young people from centres based in the heart of the inner cities.

In 1987, the Drake Fellowship merged with the Fairbridge Society to become Fairbridge Drake, and in 1992 the name was changed to Fairbridge.

In 2007, Venture Trust  separated from Fairbridge to become an independent charity.

Fairbridge's patron was Princess Alexandra, The Honourable Lady Ogilvy, its president was Damon Buffini and vice-presidents were Lady Dodds-Parker and Sir William McAlpine.

In April 2011, Fairbridge was taken over by The Prince's Trust.  The Prince's Trust then delivered "The Fairbridge Programme" using a similar model.

By December 2022, The Fairbridge Programme was no longer appearing on the official web-site.

Purpose 
Fairbridge was a national charity which helped young people develop the confidence, motivation and skills they need to turn their lives around. It was a member of The National Council for Voluntary Youth Services (NCVYS).

Bases
Based in the UK's inner city areas, Fairbridge helped circa 3,700 young people a year from its 16 centres. The charity operated from team centres in Bristol, Southampton, Hackney in East London and Kennington in South London, Chatham, Kent (based out of Offices within the Historic Chatham Dockyard), Birmingham, Liverpool, Salford in Greater Manchester and Bury in North Manchester, Middlesbrough, Newcastle-upon-Tyne, Cardiff, Swansea, Dundee, Edinburgh and Glasgow.

Activities

Fairbridge worked with young people who had experienced school exclusion, homelessness, anti-social behavior, crime, substance misuse and mental health issues. By a combination of one-to-one support and challenging activities, young people made positive changes in their lives to enter education, training or employment.

Activities included outdoor pursuits, cooking, IT, drama, art, music, sexual health, work-based and independent living courses. The charity owned a 92’ sailing ship Spirit of Fairbridge which fosters self belief through personal challenges.

References

External links
 
  The National Council for Voluntary Youth Services (NCVYS)
 

Youth charities based in the United Kingdom
Organizations established in 1909
1909 establishments in the United Kingdom
1987 mergers and acquisitions
2007 mergers and acquisitions
2011 mergers and acquisitions
The Prince's Trust